Posey is a small, unincorporated, community located on the level plains of the Llano Estacado about  southeast of Lubbock in southeastern Lubbock County, Texas.

History
According to the wife of John E. Williams, a great-grandson of James B. Posey and a great-nephew of Walter S. Posey, the events that led to the naming of Posey are: In 1904, James B. Posey and Lewis T. Lester purchased controlling interest in First National Bank of Lubbock.  Later, in 1908, the James B. Posey family purchased a farm between Lubbock and Slaton and built a house on what later proved to be in the center of the survey of the proposed Atchison, Topeka and Santa Fe Railway.  The family moved the house about a mile north, and when the railroad was established, a switch was installed on the original site of the Posey house and subsequently named "Posey Switch".  Later, when a community grew up around Posey Switch, the name was abbreviated to "Posey".

According to the Handbook of Texas, the community of Posey was officially founded in 1936 with a population of 25 people and three businesses. Posey grew to a population of 70 by 1941 and by then it had a church, a school, a grain elevator, and two businesses.  The Posey school was consolidated with those of Slaton by the 1960s, and today, the community has an active cotton gin, a Lutheran church, and a few scattered homes.

For transportation, Posey is well situated.  U.S. Highway 84 runs along the east side of Posey and Farm to Market Road 1585 passes to the south.  The BNSF Railway now owns and operates the tracks on the east side of town, but passenger service was discontinued long ago and the many freight trains that pass through the area rarely pause in the vicinity of Posey Switch.

See also

West Texas
Yellow House Canyon

References

External links

Public domain photos of the Llano Estacado

Unincorporated communities in Lubbock County, Texas
Unincorporated communities in Texas
1936 establishments in Texas